Teneu (or Thenew, Tannoch, Thaney, Thanea, Denw, etc.) is a legendary Christian saint who was venerated in medieval Glasgow, Scotland. Traditionally she was a sixth-century Brittonic princess of the ancient kingdom of Gododdin (in what became Lothian) and the mother of Saint Mungo, apostle to the Britons of Strathclyde and founder of the city of Glas Ghu (Glasgow). She and her son are regarded as the city's co-patrons, and Glasgow's St Enoch Square allegedly marks the site of a medieval chapel dedicated to her, built on or near her grave ("St. Enoch" is in fact a corruption of "St. Teneu"). She is commemorated annually on 18 July.

Name
In the first recorded hagiography of her son, her name is given as Thaney. The Vita Kentigerni ("Life of Saint Mungo"), which was commissioned by Bishop Jocelin of Glasgow and redacted later (circa 1185) by the monk Jocelyn of Furness (who claimed he rewrote it from an earlier Glasgow legend and an old Gaelic document), gives her name as Taneu; so does John Capgrave, printed 1516. Variants include Thenewe, given by the Aberdeen Breviary; Thennow of Adam King's Calendar; and the Welsh Bonedd y Saint calls her Denyw (or Dwynwen). In 1521, she appeared in John Mair's chronicle Historia Majoris Britanniae as Thametes, daughter of King Lot and sister of Gawain. Sometimes her name is given as Thameta or Thenelis.

Alex Woolf has suggested that the character Teneu may have been derived from Danaë, mother of the classical hero Perseus in the Fabulae of Gaius Julius Hyginius.

Legend
Saint Teneu has been described as "Scotland's first recorded rape victim, battered woman and unmarried mother". Her son was conceived when the Welsh prince Owain mab Urien raped her. Owain was disguised as a woman, and after sexually assaulting the naïve princess, he confused her by saying: "Weep not, my sister, for I have not known thee as a man is used to know a virgin. Am I not a woman like thyself?" Upon discovering her pregnancy, her angry father King Lleuddun sentenced her to death and she was hurled from Traprain Law. Miraculously she survived the fall; when discovered alive at the foot of the cliff, Teneu was set adrift in a coracle and travelled across the Firth of Forth to Culross, where she was given shelter at the community of Saint Serf. There she gave birth to and raised her son Kentigern, whom Serf nicknamed Mungo, "very dear one".

There are also Welsh legends about Teneu:

Modern adaptations
She is the subject of Kathleen Herbert's historical novel, Bride of the Spear, part of her Dark Ages of Britain trilogy, as Taniu, (1982, St Martin's Press), and of Nigel Tranter's historical novel Druid Sacrifice (1993, Hodder & Stoughton), as Thanea.

See also
Wish tree

References

External links
Saints SQPN.com » Saint Theneva
Early British Kingdoms - Saint Thaney
5-7c. Brythonic Women's Names: Den(y)w

6th-century births
6th-century Christian saints
6th-century deaths
Arthurian characters
Converts to Christianity from pagan religions
Northern Brythonic saints
People associated with Glasgow
People from East Lothian
Female saints of medieval Scotland
Mythological rape victims
6th-century Scottish women
Rape in Scotland